1,3,8-Trihydroxyanthraquinone is an organic compound. It is one of many trihydroxyanthraquinone isomers, formally derived from anthraquinone by replacement of three hydrogen atoms by hydroxyl (OH) groups.

The compound occurs in some microorganisms and in alcoholic extracts of the wood of the South American plant Senna reticulata (mangerioba grande or maria mole in Portuguese), used in the local folk medicine for liver problems and rheumatism.  The extract also contained, among other products chrysophanol (1,8-dihydroxy-3-methylanthraquinone), physcion (1,8-dihydroxy-3-methyl-6-methoxyanthraquinone), aloe-emodin (3-carbinol-1,8-dihydroxyanthraquinone), lunatin (3-methoxy-1,6,8-trihydroxyanthraquinone), emodin (6-methyl-1,3,8-trihydroxyanthraquinone), and chrysophanol-10,10'-bianthrone.

The substance is soluble in ethanol and chloroform but not in n-hexane, and melts at 283 °C.

See also
Trihydroxyanthraquinone
Hydroxyanthraquinone

References

Trihydroxyanthraquinones
Resorcinols